Jan Falandys (born 18 June 1956) is a retired light-flyweight freestyle wrestler from Poland. He won bronze medals at the world championships in 1979 and 1983 and placed fourth at the 1980 Summer Olympics.

References

1956 births
Living people
People from Rzeszów County
Sportspeople from Podkarpackie Voivodeship
Polish male sport wrestlers
Wrestlers at the 1980 Summer Olympics
Olympic wrestlers of Poland
World Wrestling Championships medalists
20th-century Polish people
21st-century Polish people